Monywa District (formerly Lower Chindwin District)
 is an administrative district in southern Sagaing Division,  Burma (Myanmar).  Its administrative center is the city of Monywa.

Administrative divisions
Monywa District consists of the following townships:

 Ayadaw Township
 Budalin Township
 Chaung-U Township
 Monywa Township

Monywa District also consisted of the following townships, which formed to become Yinmabin District:

 Kani Township
 Pale Township
 Salingyi Township
 Yinmabin Township

Also, it had a township that has recently annexed into Shwebo District:

 Tabayin Township

Borders
Monywa District is bordered by:
 Mawlaik District to the north,
 Yinmabin District to the west,
 Sagaing District to the south

Notable residents 

 Aung Khin, Burmese painter

Notes

Districts of Myanmar
Sagaing Region